The first season of the American comedy-drama television series Orange Is the New Black premiered on Netflix on July 11, 2013, at 12:00 am PST in multiple countries. It consists of thirteen episodes, each between 51–60 minutes. The series is based on Piper Kerman's memoir, Orange Is the New Black: My Year in a Women's Prison (2010), about her experiences at FCI Danbury, a minimum-security federal prison. Created and adapted for television by Jenji Kohan. In July 2011, Netflix was in negotiations with Lionsgate for a 13-episode TV adaptation of Kerman's memoirs. The series began filming in the old Rockland Children's Psychiatric Center in Rockland County, New York, on March 7, 2013. The title sequence features photos of real former female prisoners including Kerman herself.

The series revolves around Piper Chapman (Taylor Schilling), a woman in her 30s living in New York City who is sentenced to 15 months in Litchfield Penitentiary, a minimum-security women's federal prison (initially operated by the "Federal Department of Corrections," a fictional version of the Federal Bureau of Prisons, and later acquired by Management & Correction Corporation (MCC), a private prison company) in upstate New York. Piper had been convicted of transporting a suitcase full of drug money for her then-girlfriend Alex Vause (Laura Prepon), an international drug smuggler.

Orange is the New Black received critical acclaim. The series received numerous accolades including but not limited to: Satellite Award for Best Television Series – Musical or Comedy and Critics' Choice Television Award for Best Comedy Series. Also was nominated for a Writers Guild of America Award for Television: Comedy Series, Writers Guild of America Award for Television: New Series and NAACP Image Award for Outstanding Writing in a Dramatic Series. Taylor Schilling was nominated for a Golden Globe Award for Best Actress – Television Series Drama. For the 66th Primetime Emmy Awards, the series was honored with 12 nominations, winning Outstanding Casting for a Comedy Series, Outstanding Single-Camera Picture Editing for a Comedy Series and Primetime Emmy Award for Outstanding Guest Actress in a Comedy Series (Uzo Aduba).

Plot
Piper Chapman (Taylor Schilling) is sentenced to fifteen months at Litchfield Penitentiary, a women's prison, for a drug-related crime she committed ten years earlier. Leaving behind her supportive fiancé, Larry (Jason Biggs), Piper begins her term at Litchfield and meets several inmates including Red (Kate Mulgrew), the powerful matriarch of the prison kitchen; Nicky Nichols (Natasha Lyonne), a former heroin addict whom Piper befriends; Miss Claudette (Michelle Hurst), Piper's stern roommate; and Suzanne "Crazy Eyes" Warren (Uzo Aduba), a mentally unstable inmate who makes a romantic move on Piper. Piper also meets Sam Healy (Michael J. Harney), her homophobic counselor who deals with many of the inmates' problems. Struggling to adjust to the dynamics of the prison, Piper's problems are further compounded when she discovers that her former lover, Alex Vause (Laura Prepon), is in the same prison as her. The first season mainly focuses on Piper's experiences in prison and her growing relationship with Alex, while also providing the backstories of several inmates at Litchfield.

Episodes

Cast and characters

Main cast

 Taylor Schilling as Piper Chapman, inmate
 Laura Prepon as Alex Vause, inmate
 Michael Harney as Sam Healy, correctional officer 
 Michelle Hurst as Miss Claudette Pelage, inmate 
 Kate Mulgrew as Galina "Red" Reznikov, inmate
 Jason Biggs as Larry Bloom, Piper's fiancé

Recurring cast

Inmates

Production
Show creator Jenji Kohan read Piper Kerman's memoir after a friend sent it to her. She then set up a meeting with Kerman to pitch her on a TV adaptation, which she notes she "screwed up" as she spent most of the time asking Kerman about her experiences she described in the book rather than selling her on the show. This appealed to Kerman as it let her know that she was a fan and she signed off on the adaptation. Kohan would later go on to describe the main character, Piper Chapman, as a "trojan horse" for the series, allowing it to focus on characters whose demographics would not normally be represented on TV. In July 2011, it was revealed that Netflix was in negotiations with Lionsgate for a 13-episode TV adaptation of Kerman's memoirs with Kohan as creator. In November 2011, negotiations were finalized and the series had been greenlit.

Casting
Casting announcements began in August 2012 with Taylor Schilling, the first to be cast, in the lead role as Piper Chapman, followed by Jason Biggs as Piper's fiancé Larry Bloom. Laura Prepon and Yael Stone were next to join the series. Abigail Savage, who plays Gina, and Alysia Reiner, who plays Fig, had auditioned for role of Alex Vause. Prepon initially auditioned for Piper Chapman, however Kohan felt she would not worry about her [in prison], noting a "toughness and a presence to her that wasn’t right for the character." Kohan instead gave her the role of Alex. Stone had originally auditioned for the role of Nicky Nichols, but she was not considered "tough enough" for the character; she was asked to audition for Lorna Morello instead. Likability was important for Morello, whom casting director Jen Euston deemed "a very helpful, nice, sweet Italian girl." Laverne Cox, a black transgender woman, was cast as Sophia Burset, a transgender character. The Advocate touted Orange Is the New Black as possibly the first women-in-prison narrative to cast a transgender woman for this type of role. Natasha Lyonne was to audition for Alex, but was asked to read for the character Nicky Nichols; "[Kohan knew] she could do Nicky with her eyes closed. She was perfect," said Euston. Uzo Aduba read for the part of Janae Watson but was offered the character Suzanne "Crazy Eyes" Warren. Taryn Manning was offered the role of Tiffany "Pennsatucky" Doggett. This American Life host Ira Glass was offered a role as a public radio host, but he declined. The role instead went to Robert Stanton, who plays the fictional host Maury Kind.

Reception

Critical response
Orange Is the New Black has received critical acclaim, particularly praised for humanizing prisoners and for its depiction of race, sexuality, gender and body types. The first season received positive reviews from critics, review aggregator Metacritic gave it a weighted average score of 79 out of 100 based on reviews from 32 critics, indicating favorable reviews. On Rotten Tomatoes, season one has a 93% approval rating based on 40 reviews, with an average rating of 8.2 out of 10 . The site's critical consensus is "Orange Is the New Black is a sharp mix of black humor and dramatic heft, with interesting characters and an intriguing flashback structure."

Hank Stuever, television critic for The Washington Post, gave Orange Is the New Black a perfect score. In his review of the series, he stated: "In Jenji Kohan's magnificent and thoroughly engrossing new series, Orange Is the New Black, prison is still the pits. But it is also filled with the entire range of human emotion and stories, all of which are brought vividly to life in a world where a stick of gum could ignite either a romance or a death threat." Maureen Ryan, of The Huffington Post, wrote: "Orange is one of the best new programs of the year, and the six episodes I've seen have left me hungry to see more."

Critics' top ten list
Orange Is the New Black was considered one of the best shows of the year by many critics and journalists.

 1st – Boob Tube Dude
 1st – The Daily Beast
 2nd – Boston Globe
 2nd – Film School Rejects
 2nd – HitFix
 2nd – Indiewire
 2nd – Los Angeles Times
 2nd – San Francisco Chronicle
 2nd – Washington Post
 3rd – PopMatters
 3rd – Slate
 3rd – Time
 4th – Complex
 4th – Entertainment Weekly (Melissa Maerz)
 4th – Paste

 5th – Grantland
 5th – Lincoln Journal Star
 6th – Entertainment Weekly (Jeff Jensen)
 6th – New York Vulture
 6th – Philadelphia Daily News
 6th – Pittsburgh Post-Gazette
 8th – Austin Chronicle
 8th – Filmmaker Magazine
 8th – Houston Chronicle
 8th – The Oregonian
 9th – NPR
 10th – NPR Fresh Air
 – Huffington Post
 – IGN
 – RedEye Chicago

Accolades

Broadcast
The series began airing on broadcast television in New Zealand on TV2 on August 19, 2013. It premiered in Australia on October 9, 2013, on Showcase.

References

External links

 
 

Orange Is the New Black
2013 American television seasons